Zoltán Bakó (born 11 November 1951) is a Hungarian sprint canoeist who competed during the 1970s. Competing in two Summer Olympics, he won a bronze medal in the K-2 1000 m event at Montreal in 1976.

Bakó also won ten medals at the ICF Canoe Sprint World Championships with five golds (K-2 1000 m: 1974, 1977; K-2 10000 m: 1973, 1975, 1978), two silvers (K-2 1000 m: 1977, K-2 10000 m: 1979), and three bronzes (K-2 1000 m: 1978, K-4 1000 m: 1971, 1975).

References

External links

1951 births
Canoeists at the 1972 Summer Olympics
Canoeists at the 1976 Summer Olympics
Hungarian male canoeists
Living people
Olympic canoeists of Hungary
Olympic bronze medalists for Hungary
Olympic medalists in canoeing
ICF Canoe Sprint World Championships medalists in kayak

Medalists at the 1976 Summer Olympics
20th-century Hungarian people